John Gilgun (October 1, 1935 – April 30, 2021) was an American writer. He is best known for his 1989 novel Music I Never Dreamed Of, which was a shortlisted nominee for the Lambda Literary Award for Gay Fiction at the 3rd Lambda Literary Awards in 1990.

Gilgun's other works included Everything That Has Been Shall Be Again: The Reincarnation Fables of John Gilgun (1981); the poetry collections The Dooley Poems (1991), From the Inside Out (1991), In the Zone: The Moby Dick Poems (2002) and The Dailies (2010); and the short story collection Your Buddy Misses You (1994).

A graduate of Boston University and the University of Iowa, Gilgun was a longtime teacher of English and creative writing at Missouri Western State University until his retirement in 2000.

Giglun died on April 30, 2021, at the age of 85.

References

1935 births
2021 deaths
20th-century American novelists
20th-century American poets
American male novelists
American male short story writers
American LGBT novelists
American LGBT poets
American gay writers
People from Malden, Massachusetts
Novelists from Massachusetts
Missouri Western State University faculty
21st-century American poets
Boston University alumni
University of Iowa alumni
American male poets
20th-century American short story writers
21st-century American short story writers
20th-century American male writers
21st-century American male writers
Novelists from Missouri
Gay poets